Simco or SIMCO may refer to:

Simcoe, Missouri
Ladislav Šimčo (born 1967), Slovak footballer and manager
Riff Raff (rapper) (born Horst Simco; 1982), American rapper 
Sea ice microbial communities
Simco, a European real estate company acquired by Gecina 
Simco Ltd., British entertainment company owned by Simon Cowell and doing business as SYCO Music

See also
SIMCOS, a computer language
SIMS Co., Ltd., a video game company
Simcoe (disambiguation)
Samco (disambiguation)